Kevin Kerger (born 17 November 1994) is a Luxembourgian international footballer who plays club football for Union Titus Pétange, as a left back.

Career
Kerger has played club football for FC Mamer 32 and FC UNA Strassen.

He made his international debut for Luxembourg in 2016. It was his only game for the national team.

References

1994 births
Living people
Luxembourgian footballers
Luxembourg international footballers
Association football defenders
FC Mamer 32 players
FC UNA Strassen players
FC Progrès Niederkorn players
Union Titus Pétange players
Luxembourg National Division players